Arnold Bernard Tusa (born August 23, 1940) is a Canadian politician, who represented the electoral district of Last Mountain-Touchwood in the Legislative Assembly of Saskatchewan from 1982 to 1991. A member of the Saskatchewan Progressive Conservative Party, he served as Speaker of the Legislative Assembly in his second term in office from 1986 to 1991.

Born in Cupar, Saskatchewan, he received a B.Ed. from the University of Saskatchewan. Tusa taught school in Saskatchewan and later operated a farm.

References 

1940 births
Progressive Conservative Party of Saskatchewan MLAs
Living people
Speakers of the Legislative Assembly of Saskatchewan